The Orwell Foundation is a charity registered in England and Wales, the aim of which is "to perpetuate the achievements of the British writer George Orwell (1903–1950)". The Foundation runs the Orwell Prize, the UK's most prestigious prize for political writing. In addition to the Prizes, the Orwell Foundation also runs free public events, debates and lectures and provides free online resources by and about Orwell. Since 2014, they have also run "Unreported Britain". The Orwell Youth Prize, a separate charity, work with young people aged 12–18 around the UK. The Orwell Youth Prize organises writing workshops for young people and runs a writing prize, culminating in an annual Celebration Day. The foundation is based at University College London, and is a registered charity no. 1161563.

Orwell Prize

The Orwell Prize, established in 1994, is an annual award recognising and rewarding the books and journalism that come closest to realizing Orwell's ambition to "make political writing into an art". Between 2009 and 2012, a third prize was awarded for blogging, and in 2015, The Orwell Prize for Exposing Britain's Social Evils was launched. For more information, including past shortlists and winners, see the separate Orwell Prize page.

Unreported Britain
The Foundations "Unreported Britain" initiative was started with the aim of finding stories that are otherwise ignored from communities whose voices are unheard, and giving them platform, profile and leverage.

Lectures and debates
The Orwell Foundation organises free public lectures and debates. There are currently two annual Orwell Lectures: the Orwell Lecture at University College London and, from 2017, the Orwell Lecture in the North at the University of Sheffield.

Previous Orwell Lectures
 1989: "Big Brother, Big Sister and Today's Media" – Bruce Kent
 1990: "Must Revolutions Fail?" – Sir Ralf Dahrendorf
 1991: "Fiction and Agnosticism" – Penelope Lively
 1992: "Socialist Values" – Robin Cook
 1993: "Changing the Legal Culture" – Helena Kennedy
 1994: "But is it Socialism?" – Roy Hattersley
 1995: "Risk" – Anthony Giddens
 1996: "The Ministry of Agriculture: The Ministry of Truth" – Richard Lacey
 1997: "Inside the Whale: the Relationship between the State and the Individual" – Frank Field
 1998: "Orwell's 'little list'" – Peter Davison
 1999: "The English Problem: National Identity and Citizenship" – Sir Bernard Crick
 2000: "Nation, State and Globalisation" – Martin Wolf
 2001: "House of Memory and London's Orbital Motorway" – Iain Sinclair
 2002: Patrick Wright
 2003: "From Authority to Celebrity – Intellectuals in Modern Britain" – Stefan Collini
 2004: "Just Law: The changing fact of justice and why it matters" – Helena Kennedy
 2005: "Projections of the inner 'I': George Orwell's Fiction" – D.J. Taylor
 2006: "Homo Brittanicus, Soctophobia and All That" – Neal Ascherson
 2007: "The Politics of Response – Orwell's contribution to the questions of how we read and what reading is for" – Michael Rosen
 2008: "The English" – Andrew O'Hagan
 2009: "'More like a castle than a realm': Thomas Cromwell's Radical England" – Hilary Mantel
 2010: "Orwell and the Oligarchs" – Ferdinand Mount
 2011: "Hacking away at the truth: an investigation and its consequences" – Alan Rusbridger
 2012: "Secrets of the Cuban Missile Crisis" – Christopher Andrew
 2013: "Democratising the Middle East: A New Role for the West" – Tariq Ramadan
 2014: "'Whatever Happened to Social Mobility'" – David Kynaston
 2015: "War, Words and Reason: Orwell and Thomas Merton on the Crises of Language" – Dr Rowan Williams
 2016:
 "The Right to Dissent (and the Left too)" – Ian Hislop 
 The Orwell Prize Shortlist Lecture: "'Nationalism should not be confused with patriotism' – Our Divided Politics" – Ruth Davidson

Previous Orwell Lecture in the North
 2017: "I've read all the academic texts on empathy" – Grayson Perry

Orwell's legacy 
The foundation also organises events and anniversary celebrations about George Orwell.

As the only website authorised by the Orwell Estate, the foundation also publishes online resources by and about Orwell, which can be read for free here.

Orwell Youth Prize
The Orwell Youth Prize works with young people aged 12–18

References

External links
 Official website

Charities based in the United Kingdom